Margarella refulgens is a species of sea snail, a marine gastropod mollusk in the family Calliostomatidae.

Description
The size of the shell varies between 4 mm and 11 mm.

Distribution
This marine species occurs off the South Sandwich Islands and in the Weddell Sea, Antarctica, at depths between 202 m and 1,108 m.

References

 Smith, E. A. 1907. Mollusca. II. Gastropoda. National Antarctic Expedition 1901-1904, Natural History 2: 12 pp., 2 pls. British Museum (Natural History): London.

External links
 To World Register of Marine Species
 

refulgens
Gastropods described in 1907